Everard Coenraad "Ducky" Endt (born April 7, 1893 in Zaandam, Netherlands to mother Johanna E Dekker and father Hendrik Endt). His date of death is currently unknown. Everard became a US citizen in October 1933.

Everard was part of the crew of the yacht "Dorade" that raced in the Fastnet Yacht race in 1933.

Everard divorced his 2nd wife, Whitney in March 1936 in Reno, Nevada after 5 years of marriage.

Everard was an American sailor and Olympic champion. He competed at the 1952 Summer Olympics in Helsinki, where he won a gold medal in the 6 metre class with the boat Llanoria. Endt was the oldest American to win a gold medal in yachting (aged 59).

Everard served in the US Navy Reserves as an officer, reaching the rank of Commander in 1945. In 1944, while participating in the D-Day landings at Normandy, he assisted in the building of the Mulberry Docks. Everard retired from the US Navy Reserves in May 1953.

References

External links

1893 births
American male sailors (sport)
Sailors at the 1952 Summer Olympics – 6 Metre
Olympic gold medalists for the United States in sailing
Year of death missing
Medalists at the 1952 Summer Olympics